Rosina Schnorr (7 October 1618 – November 11, 1679), was a German business person.

She was married to the merchant Hans Veit Schnorr, who managed the textile coloring factory in Niederpfannenstiel and Auernhammer. After the death of her spouse in 1664, she took over his business. She also expanded in to the mining industry. She was active as a philanthropist, and founded an orphanage in Schneeberg. Schnorr is regarded to be a notable example of a female business person in the 17th century. In 2013, she was commemorated in the city of Aue in Germany.

References
  Ludwig Beck: Historien om järnet. Vol. 2: Den XVI. och XVII. Talet., Braunschweig, 1895. (i DWDS)
  Siegfried Sieber :. Festschrift för 750-årsjubileum av staden i Erzgebirge Aue 1923:e
  Klaus Walther (red.): Erzgebirge. Landskap, dåtid, nutid, Mironde-Verlag 2013 . [4]
  Bernd Lahl :. Rosina Schnorr – Den mest betydande affärs Sachsen i 17-talet i: Porten, Magasin för konst och kultur i gruv 66 (2014), nr 1, sid 54–55. ISSN 0003-5238

17th-century German businesswomen
17th-century German businesspeople
1618 births
1679 deaths
German merchants